The award Soviet Footballer of the Year was awarded to the best footballer of the Soviet Union from 1964 until 1991. The poll was conducted among journalists by the weekly sport newspaper Football (Football-Hockey). Each journalist named his own top three player every year. Each place carried a point weight such as 1st place was worth 3 pts., 2nd - 2, and 3rd - 1.

The idea for the award appeared right after Lev Yashin has received Ballon d'Or award in 1963. The honours were awarded along with several other prizes and awards at the end of the competition season. For goalkeepers being not limited from the Soviet Footballer of the Year, also were awarded separate honours the "Best Goalkeeper of the Year". The best goal-scorer of the Soviet Top League was awarded with the "Best Topscorer of the Year". Before becoming an official award before 1964, in 1950s Moskovskij Komsomolets and Komsomolskaya Pravda were conducting own polls to honour the best footballer of the country.

List of winners

Most wins by club

Most wins by player

See also
After the Soviet Union dissolved most of the new independent countries created their own awards to the best footballer of the year. A few countries including Ukraine, Belarus and Lithuania had been awarding their own awards even before the collapse of Soviet Union.
 Armenian Footballer of the Year
 Azerbaijani Footballer of the Year
 Belarusian Footballer of the Year
 Estonian Footballer of the Year
 Georgian Footballer of the Year
 Kazakhstani Footballer of the Year
 Latvian Footballer of the Year
 Lithuanian Footballer of the Year
 Moldovan Footballer of the Year
 Footballer of the Year in Russia (Futbol)
 Footballer of the Year in Russia (Sport-Express)
 Ukrainian Footballer of the Year
 Uzbekistan Footballer of the Year
 Footballer of the Year in Baltic and Commonwealth of Independent States

References

Soviet football trophies and awards

Awards established in 1964
1964 establishments in the Soviet Union
Awards disestablished in 1991
1991 disestablishments in the Soviet Union
Annual events in the Soviet Union
Association football player non-biographical articles